The white-spined Atlantic spiny rat (Trinomys albispinus) is a spiny rat species endemic to Brazil.

Description
The fur on the upper body and flanks is tawny to buff, interspersed with much paler (although usually not pure white) spines. The underparts, including the lower surface of the tail, are white.

Females are pregnant between January and June, and give birth to litters of up to four young.

Distribution and habitat
T. albispinus is found in a relatively small region of eastern Brazil, in the states of Sergipe and Bahia. Compared with other spiny rats, they are adapted for a relatively dry climate, and the region is dominated semi-arid caatinga forest with a mix of deciduous trees and cactuses, among other plants.

Three subspecies are recognised from different parts of this region:

 T. a. albispinus - southern coastal parts of the range
 T. a. minor - inland parts of the range
 T. a. sertonius - northern coastal parts of the range

References

Trinomys
Endemic fauna of Brazil
Mammals described in 1838